Hermann Wendland (October 11, 1825 in Herrenhausen – January 12, 1903 in Hanover) was a German botanist and gardener.

He was a noted authority on the family Arecaceae (palms), on which he published a major monograph which formed the basis for the modern classification of the family, including many of the generic names currently in use.

The South American palm genus Wendlandiella is named after him.

Publications
 Die Königlichen Gärten zu Herrenhausen bei Hannover (Hannover, 1852)
 Index palmarum, cyclanthearum, pandanearum, cycadearum, quae in hortis europaeis coluntur (Hannover, 1854).

Taxonomist

References

External links
PACSOA biography

German gardeners
German taxonomists
1825 births
1903 deaths
Scientists from Hanover
19th-century German botanists